Midkiff Rock is a rock outcrop on the broad ice-covered ridge between Hammond Glacier and Swope Glacier,  east-southeast of Mount West, in the Ford Ranges of Marie Byrd Land, Antarctica. It was mapped by the United States Antarctic Service (USAS) (1939–41) and by the United States Geological Survey from surveys and U.S. Navy air photos (1959–65). The feature was named by the Advisory Committee on Antarctic Names for Frank T. Midkiff, Jr., aviation machinist's mate, U.S. Navy, s helicopter flight crewman during Operation Deep Freeze 1968.

References

Rock formations of Marie Byrd Land